Wise is a small unincorporated community located on U.S. Route 1 in Warren County, North Carolina, United States. The nearest town is Norlina.

The Warren County Training School was listed on the National Register of Historic Places in 2006.

References

Unincorporated communities in Warren County, North Carolina
Unincorporated communities in North Carolina